Sustainable Development Technology Canada (SDTC) is an arm's-length foundation created by the Government of Canada to fund new clean technologies.

History
In 2001, the Government of Canada created Sustainable Development Technology Canada (SDTC) as an arm's-length foundation to “demonstrate new technologies to promote sustainable development, including technologies to address issues related to climate change and the quality of air, water and soil.”
These clean technologies, such as fuel cells and biofuels, are developed through public-private partnerships with SDTC acting as a funder.

Investments
SDTC has invested in about 300 projects throughout Canada. On average 33% (up to 40%) of projects costs can be covered the program.

Governance
Leah Lawrence is the president and CEO of Sustainable Development Technology Canada. SDTC is overseen by a Board of Directors, with Annette Verschuren as the chair.

References

External links
 Official Website

Federal departments and agencies of Canada
Natural Resources Canada
2001 establishments in Ontario